Abaris usually refers to Abaris the Hyperborean, a legendary sage, healer, and priest of Apollo known to the Ancient Greeks.

Abaris may also refer to:

Mythology
Abaris (Caucasian), a Caucasian killed by Perseus
Abaris (Dolionian), one of the Dolionians
Abaris (Aeneid), an ally of Turnus

Other uses
Abaris, another name of the opera Les Boréades
Abaris Books, a US scholarly publishing house
Abaris (beetle), genus of beetles
Georgios Abaris, Greek footballer
Abaris, another name of Avaris, Hyksos capital of Egypt